Puppet is a 1957 Argentine film directed by Román Viñoly Barreto.

Cast
  Luis Sandrini
  Beatriz Taibo
  Eduardo Sandrini
  Juan Bono
  Néstor Deval
  Víctor Martucci
  Fanny Brena
  María Esther Buschiazzo
  Max Citelli
  Irma Lagos
  Nino Nor
  Irma Gabriel
  Armando Lopardo
  Amarilis Carrié
  Warly Ceriani
  Arturo Bamio		
  Mario Casado		
  Miguel Cossa		
  Camilo De Asis		
  Luis de Lucía		
  Enrique Kossi		
  Guillermo Stábile …Él mismo

External links
 

1957 films
1950s Spanish-language films
Argentine black-and-white films
Films directed by Román Viñoly Barreto
1950s Argentine films